Kashmore or Kashmor, is a town and the administrative centre of Kashmore District located in the Sindh Province of Pakistan.

Notable people
Salim Jan Khan Mazari, MNA from the Pakistan Peoples Party
Mir Hazar Khan Bijarani (Former Federal and Provincial Minister)

References

Populated places in Sindh
Kashmore District
Talukas of Sindh